Strophurus taenicauda, also known commonly as the golden spiny-tailed gecko or  the golden-tailed gecko, is a species of lizard in the family Diplodactylidae. The species is endemic to eastern Australia. Three subspecies are recognized.

Geographic range
S. taenicauda is found in New South Wales and Queensland, Australia.

Habitat
The preferred habitats of S. taenicauda are forest and shrubland.

Tail
The golden-tailed gecko can produce a spray of foul-smelling liquid from its tail as a defense mechanism
to deter potential predators.

Reproduction
S. taenicauda is oviparous.

Subspecies
The following three subspecies, including the nominotypical subspecies,  are recognized as being valid.
Strophurus taenicauda albiocularis Danny Brown, Jessica Worthington Wilmer & Stewart MacDonald.
Strophurus taenicauda taenicauda 
Strophurus taenicauda triaureus 

Nota bene: A trinomial authority in parentheses indicates that the subspecies was originally described in a genus other than Strophurus.

References

Further reading
Boulenger GA (1887). Catalogue of the Lizards in the British Museum (Natural History). Second Edition. Volume III. Lacertidæ, Gerrhosauridæ, Scincidæ, Anelytropidæ, Dibamidæ, Chamæleontidæ. London: Trustees of the British Museum (Natural History). (Taylor and Francis, printers). xii + 575 pp. + Plates I-XL. (Diplodactylus tæniocauda [sic], p. 483 in "Addenda and Corrigenda").
Brown D, Worthington Wilmer J, MacDonald S (2012). "A revision of Strophurus taenicauda (Squamata; Diplodactylidae) with description of two new subspecies from central Queensland and a southerly range extension". Zootaxa 3243 (1): 1-28. (Strophurus taenicauda albiocularis, new subspecies; S. taenicauda triaureus, new subspecies).
Cogger HG (2014). Reptiles and Amphibians of Australia, Seventh Edition. Clayton, Victoria, Australia: CSIRO Publishing. xxx + 1,033 pp. .
De Vis CW (1886). "On certain Geckos in the Queensland Museum". Proceedings of the Linnean Society of New South Wales, Second Series 1: 168-170. (Diplodactylus tænicauda, new species, pp. 169–170).
Wilson, Steve; Swan, Gerry (2013). A Complete Guide to Reptiles of Australia, Fourth Edition. Sydney: New Holland Publishers. 522 pp. .

Strophurus
Geckos of Australia
Reptiles described in 1886
Taxa named by Charles Walter De Vis